Annalisa Buffa (born 14 February 1973) is an Italian mathematician, specializing in numerical analysis and partial differential equations (PDE). She is a professor of mathematics at EPFL (École Polytechnique Fédérale de Lausanne) and holds the Chair of Numerical Modeling and Simulation.

Education and career
Buffa received her master's degree in computer engineering in 1996 and in 2000 her PhD, with supervisor Franco Brezzi, from the University of Milan with thesis Some numerical and theoretical problems in computational electromagnetism. She was from 2001 to 2004 a Researcher, from 2004 to 2013 a Research Director (rank equivalent to Professor), and from 2013 to 2016 she was the Director at the Istituto di matematica applicata e tecnologie informatiche "E. Magenes" (IMATI) of the CNR in Pavia. 

From 2016 to present, she is Full Professor of Mathematics and holds the Chair of Numerical Modeling and Simulation at EPFL.

Contributions
Buffa's research deals with a wide range of topics in PDEs and numerical analysis: "isogeometric analysis, fully compatible discretization of PDEs, linear and non linear elasticity, contact mechanics, integral equations on non-smooth manifolds, functional theory for Maxwell equations in non-smooth domains, finite element techniques for Maxwell equations, non-conforming domain decomposition methods, asymptotic analysis, stabilization techniques for finite element discretizations."

Recognition
Buffa was awarded in 2007 the Bartolozzi Prize and in 2015 the  "for her spectacular use of deep and sophisticated mathematical concepts to obtain outstanding contributions to the development of computer simulations in science and industry" (Laudatio). In 2014, she was an Invited Speaker at the International Congress of Mathematicians in Seoul with talk Spline differential forms. In 2008, she received an ERC Starting Grant and in 2016 an ERC Advanced Grant. She became a member of the Academia Europaea in 2016.

Selected works

References

External links
ICM2014 VideoSeries IL15.4: Annalisa Buffa on Aug18Mon – YouTube
Importance of Industry: Annalisa Buffa, 2015 ICIAM Collatz – YouTube
 
 Website of the Chair of Numerical Modeling and Simulation

1973 births
Living people
21st-century Italian mathematicians
Italian women mathematicians
Numerical analysts
University of Pavia alumni
21st-century women mathematicians
Members of Academia Europaea
Academic staff of the École Polytechnique Fédérale de Lausanne